AMTP may refer to:-

Association du Musée des Transports de Pithiviers, the organisation which has preserved part of the Tramway de Pithiviers à Toury in France 
American Music Theatre Project.